Undla is a village and settlement in Kadrina Parish, Lääne-Viru County, in northeastern Estonia. It lies on the left bank of the Loobu River, just northwest of Kadrina, the administrative centre of the municipality.

Actor, theatre and film director Arvo Kruusement was born in Undla in 1928.

References

 

Villages in Lääne-Viru County
Kreis Wierland